Roberto Ferraris (born 16 January 1952) is an Italian former sport shooter who competed in the 1972 Summer Olympics, in the 1976 Summer Olympics and in the 1980 Summer Olympics. At the 1976 Summer Olympics he won a bronze medal in the rapid fire pistol event.

References

1952 births
Living people
Sportspeople from Naples
Italian male sport shooters
ISSF pistol shooters
Olympic shooters of Italy
Shooters at the 1972 Summer Olympics
Shooters at the 1976 Summer Olympics
Shooters at the 1980 Summer Olympics
Olympic bronze medalists for Italy
Olympic medalists in shooting
Medalists at the 1976 Summer Olympics
20th-century Italian people